The Adventures of Kaptain Kopter & Commander Cassidy in Potato Land was originally recorded by Randy California and Ed Cassidy during the 1972/73 hiatus period of Spirit. A concept album of sorts, interspersed with dialogue, its original scheduled release in May 1973 was cancelled by Epic Records. It was eventually released in an abridged form in 1981, with the first half as new recordings and the second comprising original recordings remixed with overdubs. A reworked and fuller version, still somewhat erroneously credited to Spirit, was released in 2006 and remains available as The Original Potato Land.

Track listing 
All songs written by Randy California except noted.

Personnel

Spirit 
 Randy California – vocals, guitars, bass, miscellaneous devices
 Ed Cassidy – drums, percussion
 John Locke – keyboards
 George Valuck – keyboards

Additional musicians 
 Michael K. Lee – keyboards, vocals
 Mike Bunnell – Strings, Arranger, Conductor, Horn, Keyboards
 Joe Green – Strings, Saxophone
 Kari Nile – Keyboards
 Jeff Jarvis – Horn
 Chuck Snyder – Horn
 Mike Thornburgh – Horn

Production 
 Robert Lee – Engineer
 Mike Stone – Engineer
 Sarah Bullington Berner – Engineer
 Gary Brandt – Engineer
 Bob Burnham – Engineer
 Arnie Acosta – Mastering
 Kathe Schreyer – Design

References 

Spirit (band) albums
1981 albums
Concept albums
Rhino Records albums
Beggars Banquet Records albums